Shah Mohammad Fazle Hossain (24 March 1950 - 30 September 1983) was a Bangladeshi army officer who was executed for his role in the assassination of president Ziaur Rahman.

Career 
Fazle was born on 24 March 1950 in Barisal. In 1969 he joined the Pakistan Air Force as an officer. 

Bangladesh Liberation War

When the Bangladesh Liberation War began on 25 March 1971, Fazle was in his village home. He received military training in Murti, India and was commissioned on 9 October 1971, as part of a group of 61 officers. During the war, he fought in the Z Force, under Ziaur Rahman. After the war, Fazle got married on 18 July 1976 and had one son. 

Assassination of Ziaur Rahman

On 29 May 1981, Lt. Colonel Fazle was present at a meeting held at the house of Lt. Colonel Delwar Hossain in Chittagong Cantonment. At this meeting, the plans to assassinate Zia were finalised. At the time, Fazle was the CO of the 6th East Bengal regiment. Several hours later, Fazle called Lt. Rafiqul Hassan Khan to his office and asked him, "Will you go anywhere that I go?", to which Rafiqul replied "If you order me sir". 

At 2:30 am on 30 May 1981, the conspirators organised three teams. The first two teams were to attack the Circuit House, where Zia was staying and the third team was to shoot anyone trying to escape. Fazle was in the first strike-team, along with Lt. Colonel Mehboob, Major Khalid, Captain Jamil Haque, Captain Abdus Sattar and Lieutenant Rafiqul. 

On the way to the Circuit House, Lieutenant Rafiqul asked Lt. Colonel Fazle, "Are you going to kill the president?". Fazle replied, "No, we will only get him". When the strike team arrived at the Circuit House, Fazle fired his rocket launcher twice at the building, in order to frighten the occupants. Fazle was accidently shot by members of the second strike team, when the group arrived. Captain Jamil Haque was also accidently wounded.

Fazle and Jamil were initially taken to the Combined Military Hospital in Chittagong. When the other conspirators were escaping, Major Khaled picked up Fazle and Jamil from the hospital. However, the journey was two much for the pair and Major Khalid abandoned them at Faikchari, where they were arrested.

Death 
As Fazle was wounded during the assassination, his execution was postponed until he recovered. He was hanged on 30 September 1983, in Chittagong Prison. In his last letter to his wife, he wroteJan,

Your necklace has been torn? Do not repent. It is said in the Hadith that the souls that are friends in this world will remain so in the after world also. We will meet again, then, Inshallah. There, your necklace will never come apart. Bring up our son, religiously. Abide by religion.

Khoda Hafez.

Yours, Mala (Fazle was referring to himself as 'Mala', which means 'necklace' in Bengali).

References 
1950 births
1983 deaths

Bangladesh Army officers
People from Barisal
People convicted of murder by Bangladesh
People executed by Bangladesh by hanging
Executed Bangladeshi people